Kushim may refer to:

 Cushi, a Hebrew term generally used to refer to a dark-skinned person usually of African descent
 Kushim (Uruk Period), a Sumerian beer manufacturer, and the possible earliest known example of a named person in writing